Little Bill is an American animated educational television series created by Bill Cosby. It is based on the Little Bill book series, written by Cosby with illustrations by Varnette P. Honeywood. Cosby also composed some of the theme music, appeared in live-action in the show's intro sequence, and voiced the recurring character of Captain Brainstorm. It was Cosby's second animated series, after Fat Albert and the Cosby Kids.

The show's main character, Little Bill, is a fictionalized younger version of Cosby; the show's executive producer, Janice Burgess, described the character as "little Bill Cosby." Each episode features Little Bill learning a lesson while interacting with his large family and group of friends. The show was developed with a panel of educational consultants. The show is set in Philadelphia, Cosby's hometown. Little Bill's personality was inspired by both Cosby and his late son, Ennis Cosby; Little Bill's catchphrase "Hello, friend!" was originally a greeting that Ennis used.

The series originally ran on Nickelodeon from November 28, 1999 to February 6, 2004, and reruns continued until December 22, 2006. In September 2007, Nickelodeon announced that Little Bill would permanently move to the Noggin channel. It premiered on Noggin on September 10, 2007. Reruns continued to air until 2014, when the show was pulled from the air.

Plot
Set in Philadelphia, the show centers on Little Bill Glover as he explores everyday life through his imagination. Little Bill lives with his parents, his great grandmother Alice (nicknamed Alice the Great), his older sister April, and brother Bobby. Each episode includes a daydreaming sequence where Little Bill imagines a fantastical scenario. At the end of every show, he breaks the fourth wall by summarizing his day to the audience by talking to the audience or elephant, his hamster before going to bed, and a family member offscreen asks: "Little Bill, who are you talking to?" Causing little bill to laugh at elephant or the viewers.

History
Little Bill was first announced in 1997. It aired on Nickelodeon from 1999 until 2006. The series also aired on Nick on CBS from September 16, 2000 until September 9, 2006. In September 2007, Little Bill was moved to the Noggin channel, which advertised it as a "new series". Noggin aired five "premiere episodes" from September 10 to September 15, 2007. 

Reruns of Little Bill were shown on Noggin and the Nick Jr. channel until 2014, when Nickelodeon removed the show from its services. In addition to pulling reruns, Little Bill was removed from NickJr.com in 2014. Commenting on the show's removal from television, Distractify wrote: "Perhaps Little Bill should be left in the past."

In 2017, the American Library Association said that the Little Bill series was one of the books most often targeted for removal in school libraries due to the sexual assault allegations against Bill Cosby. In December 2014, TV Guide noted that Little Bill episodes had become difficult to find after the allegations, since the show was no longer aired on television.

Episodes

Characters

Glover household
 William "Little Bill" Glover Jr. (voiced by Xavier Pritchett) is an inquisitive five-year-old African-American boy. He has a knack for storytelling and often finds himself daydreaming his own fantasy worlds. The show's executive producer, Janice Burgess, described Little Bill as "in a way, little Bill Cosby." Little Bill's catchphrase "Hello, friend!" was originally a greeting used by Bill Cosby's late son, Ennis Cosby.
 William "Big Bill" Glover (voiced by Gregory Hines) is Little Bill, Bobby, and April's father, and is the husband of Brenda. He works as a building inspector for the city. He is nicknamed Big Bill since both he and his son are named Bill. In an interview, Bill Cosby said that "I am Big Bill."
 Brenda Glover (née Kendall) (voiced by Phylicia Rashad) is Little Bill, Bobby, and April's mother, and is the wife of Big Bill. Brenda's voice actress, Phylicia Rashad, had previously played Clair Huxtable (wife to Cosby's character, Cliff Huxtable) on The Cosby Show.
 April Glover (voiced by Monique Beasley) is the oldest and only daughter of Brenda and Big Bill. She tends to be competitive and plays basketball.
 Robert "Bobby" Glover (voiced by Devon Malik Beckford in season 1 and Tyler James Williams in season 2) is the middle child, and oldest son of the Glover children. He is a Boy Scout and plays the violin.
 Alice the Great (voiced by Ruby Dee and Anika Walker in a flashback in "Good Ol' Lightning") is the great-grandmother of Little Bill, Bobby, April, and Jamal. Alice is also Brenda and Deborah's grandmother. She is in her seventies and lives with the family.
 Elephant is the family pet, a small, light yellow hamster who lives in Little Bill's bedroom. He often rolls around the house in a plastic hamster ball. He was named after Little Bill's favorite animal.

Friends and neighbors
 Captain Brainstorm (voiced by Bill Cosby) is an astronaut who has an orange rocket and an orange space suit. Little Bill is a fan of his television show, Space Explorers.
 Andrew Mulligan (voiced by Zach Tyler Eisen) is an Irish-American boy who is Little Bill's best friend. He lives two houses away from Little Bill. He has an active imagination like Little Bill, and they often join each other in fantasy sequences. He has a dog named Farfy.
 Kiku Wong (voiced by Eunice Cho) is an Asian-American friend of Little Bill's. She likes being creative, putting on puppet shows, and making artwork. She is very ambitious and wants to be president when she grows up.
 Fuchsia Glover (voiced by Nakia Williams in season 1 and Kianna Underwood in season 2) is the paternal cousin of Little Bill, Bobby, and April. Her mother is named Vanessa and a father named Al. She is known for always speaking her mind.
 Alan "Al" Glover (voiced by Michael Green) is Big Bill's brother, Fuschia's father, Vanessa's husband, and the uncle of Little Bill, Bobby, and April. He runs a convenience store in town. 
 Dorado (voiced by Vincent Canales) is a friend of Little Bill who is Puerto Rican.
 Monty (voiced by Cole Hawkins) is the grandson of Alice the Great's friend Emmaline. He uses a wheelchair to get around, and he was born with cerebral palsy. Later in the series, he joins Little Bill's class.
 Michael Riley (voiced by Muhammad Cunningham) is a classmate of Little Bill's who moves to the neighborhood from Miami, Florida.
 Miss Murray (voiced by Ayo Haynes in season 1 and Melanie Nicholls-King in season 2) is Little Bill's kindergarten teacher. She marries Dr. Clinkscales in "Miss Murray's Wedding".
 Dr. Winthrop Clinkscales (voiced by Christopher Grossett) is Mrs. Murray's husband, whom she married in "Miss Murray's Wedding".
 Mrs. Shapiro (voiced by Madeline Kahn in her first appearance, and later by Kathy Najimy after Khan's death) is Little Bill's neighbor.
 Mr. Miguel Rojas (voiced by Victor Argo) is an elderly Mexican-American man who speaks English and Spanish.
 Mr. Clark Terry (voiced by Clark Terry) is Alice the Great and Little Bill's new friend. He was voiced by Clark Terry, whom he is named and modeled after.
 Baby Jamal Welsh is Little Bill's maternal baby cousin, son of Deborah (Brenda's sister) and Gary.
 Percy Mulch (voiced by Doug E. Doug) is the owner of a pet shop.
 Mr. Williams (voiced by Mike Mearian) is a music store owner.
 Aunt Deborah Kendall (voiced by Grace Garland) is Brenda's younger sister, the wife of Uncle Gary (Weston Clark) and the mother of Baby Jamal.

Related media 
Several episodes were released to VHS and DVD by Paramount Home Media Distribution. A computer game, Little Bill Thinks Big, was released on September 29, 2003 for Windows XP and Macintosh.

Main video releases

Episodes on Nick Jr. compilation DVDs

Awards
Emmy Awards
2003 – Outstanding Performer In An Animated Program – Gregory Hines
2004 – Outstanding Children's Animated Program
Peabody Award
 2001

Footnotes

References

External links 

 
 

1990s American animated television series
1990s American black cartoons
1990s American black television series
1999 American television series debuts
2000s American animated television series
2000s American black cartoons
2000s American black television series
2004 American television series endings
American children's animated fantasy television series
American television series with live action and animation
English-language television shows
Nickelodeon original programming
Nick Jr. original programming
American television shows based on children's books
Peabody Award-winning television programs
Daytime Emmy Award for Outstanding Animated Program winners
Television series created by Bill Cosby
American preschool education television series
Animated television series about children
Animated television series about families
Animation based on real people
Television shows set in Pennsylvania
1990s Nickelodeon original programming
2000s Nickelodeon original programming
Television shows set in Philadelphia